The Isle of Forgotten Women is a 1927 American silent drama film directed by George B. Seitz. It was released as Forgotten Women in the UK.

Cast
 Conway Tearle as Bruce Paine
 Dorothy Sebastian as Marua
 Gibson Gowland as John Stort
 Alice Calhoun as Alice Burroughs
 Harry Semels
 William Welsh as (as William Welch)

References

External links

1927 films
Silent American drama films
American silent feature films
1927 drama films
Columbia Pictures films
Films directed by George B. Seitz
American black-and-white films
1920s American films